Boven-Haastrecht is a town in the Dutch province of South Holland, where it is a part of the municipality of Krimpenerwaard, about 6 km east of Gouda.

The statistical area of Boven-Haastrecht, including the surrounding countryside, has a population of around 220.

Boven-Haastrecht was part of Vlist until 2015.

References

Populated places in South Holland
Krimpenerwaard